Catocala borthi is a moth in the family Erebidae. It is found in China (Sichuan).

References

borthi
Moths described in 2012
Moths of Asia